Fawley Bottom is a small village in south Buckinghamshire, England, north of Henley-on-Thames. It is in the civil parish of Fawley.

The artist John Piper and his wife, the librettist Myfanwy Piper, were notable long-term residents of Fawley Bottom Farmhouse in the 20th century, from the mid-1930s for the rest of their lives in the 1990s.

See also 
 Fawley village
 Fawley Court

References

External links 

 Map from Buckinghamshire County Council
 Painting of Fawley Bottom Farmhouse by John Piper, 1981
 Fawley Bottom — Action Network from the BBC
 Geograph — Fawley Bottom Lane photograph

Villages in Buckinghamshire
Piper family